Prince William Augustus Edward of Saxe-Weimar-Eisenach, PC(Ire) (11 October 1823 – 16 November 1902) was a British military officer of German parents. After a career in the Grenadier Guards, he became Major General commanding the Brigade of Guards and General Officer Commanding the Home District in 1870, General Officer Commanding Southern District in October 1878 and Commander-in-Chief, Ireland in October 1885. He was promoted to field marshal in 1897 despite his career including no great military achievements.

Career
Edward was born to Prince Bernhard of Saxe-Weimar-Eisenach and Princess Ida of Saxe-Meiningen at Bushy House, the home of his mother's sister Adelaide and her husband the future William IV of the United Kingdom.

After being naturalised as a British subject, Edward's military career began on 1 June 1841, when, having trained at the Royal Military College, Sandhurst, he joined the 67th (South Hampshire) Regiment of Foot as an ensign. He was promoted to ensign in the Grenadier Guards and lieutenant in the Army on 8 June 1841 and lieutenant in his regiment and captain in the Army on 19 May 1846 before becoming adjutant of his battalion in November 1850.

Edward was promoted to brevet major in the Grenadier Guards on 20 June 1854. He served in the Crimean War and fought at the Battle of Alma in September 1854 and the Siege of Sevastopol in October 1854, where he was slightly injured. He fought on at the Battle of Balaclava in October 1854 and the Battle of Inkerman in November 1854. He was promoted to brevet lieutenant-colonel "for distinguished Service in the Field" during the war on 12 December 1854.

Edward was appointed an aide-de-camp to the Queen and received his colonelcy in the Grenadier Guards on 5 October 1855. Granted the style of Royal Highness (to both Edward and his wife) in 1866, he was promoted to major-general on 6 March 1868. He was appointed Major General commanding the Brigade of Guards and General Officer Commanding the Home District in 1870 and, having been promoted to lieutenant general on 6 July 1877, he became General Officer Commanding Southern District in October 1878. Promoted to full general on 4 November 1879, he went on to be Commander-in-Chief, Ireland and a member of the Irish Privy Council in October 1885 before retiring in October 1890.

In retirement Edward was a commissioner of the Patriotic Fund. He also became colonel of the 10th Regiment of Foot and then colonel of the 1st Regiment of Life Guards. He was promoted to field marshal on 22 June 1897 following which there was adverse comment in The Times that his career had included no great military achievements.

Prince and Princess Edward had for several years a summer residence at North Berwick, and in October 1902 the Prince was honoured with the Freedom of the Royal burgh of North Berwick, a week after he had hosted King Edward VII as his guest there for a couple of days.

Edward died on 16 November 1902 at Portland Place in London and was buried in Chichester Cathedral, in the crypt of his wife's family, the dukes of Richmond and Lennox.

Family
On 27 November 1851 Edward married, morganatically, Lady Augusta Katherine Gordon-Lennox, (a daughter of Charles Gordon-Lennox, 5th Duke of Richmond), who was created Countess of Dornburg by the Grand Duke of Saxe-Weimar the day before the wedding. The Court Circular shows that she was usually known by that title until early 1886, when the Circular began to consistently refer to her by her husband's title, i.e. "HSH Princess Edward of Saxe-Weimar". They had no children.

Ancestry

Honours

Edward received the following orders and decorations:

References

Sources

External links

|-

|-

|-

|-

1823 births
1902 deaths
Burials at Chichester Cathedral
67th Regiment of Foot officers
British Life Guards officers
Graduates of the Royal Military College, Sandhurst
Grenadier Guards officers
Royal Lincolnshire Regiment officers
British field marshals
Commanders-in-Chief, Ireland
British Army personnel of the Crimean War
Knights of St Patrick
Knights Grand Cross of the Order of the Bath
Knights Grand Cross of the Royal Victorian Order
Chevaliers of the Légion d'honneur
Recipients of the Order of the Netherlands Lion
Knights Grand Cross of the Military Order of William
Recipients of the Order of the Medjidie, 3rd class
Members of the Privy Council of Ireland
House of Saxe-Weimar-Eisenach
Military personnel from London
Princes of Saxe-Weimar-Eisenach
People from Richmond, London
Naturalised citizens of the United Kingdom